Mursa is a genus of moths of the family Erebidae.

Taxonomy
The genus has previously been classified in the subfamily Phytometrinae within Erebidae or in the subfamily Herminiinae of the family Noctuidae.

Species
Mursa fuscireticulata (Kaye, 1901)
Mursa gracilis (Möschler, 1890)
Mursa imitatrix (Warren, 1889)
Mursa phtisialis (Guenée, 1854)
Mursa sotiusalis (Walker, 1859)
Mursa subrufa (Warren, 1889)

References

Boletobiinae
Noctuoidea genera